Nathan Smith may refer to:

Sports
Nathan Smith (Irish cricketer) (born 1995), Irish cricketer
Nathan Smith (New Zealand cricketer) (born 1998), New Zealand cricketer
Nathan Smith (rugby league, born 1983), Australian rugby league player for Penrith Panthers
Nathan Smith (rugby league, born 1988), Australian rugby league footballer for the Parramatta Eels
Nathan Smith (footballer, born 1987), English-born Jamaican football player
Nathan Smith (soccer, born 1994), American soccer player
Nathan Smith (footballer, born 1996), English football player
Nathan Smith (golfer) (born 1978), American amateur golfer
Nate Smith (golfer) (born 1983), American professional golfer on the Nationwide Tour
Nathan Smith (ice hockey, born 1982), Canadian NHL player
Nathan Smith (ice hockey, born 1998), American Olympic hockey player
Nathan Smith (biathlete) (born 1985), Canadian biathlete

Others
Nathan Smith (senator) (1770–1835), U.S. Senator
Nathan Lloyd Smith (1975–2002), Canadian soldier, killed in Afghanistan
Nathan Smith (physician) (1762–1829), founder of several U.S. medical schools
Nathan Ryno Smith (1797–1877), U.S. physician, professor at University of Maryland

See also
Nathaniel Smith (disambiguation)
Nate  Smith (disambiguation)